Paoli is an unincorporated community in the town of Montrose, in Dane County, Wisconsin, United States.

Notable people
Peter W. Matts - Wisconsin State Representative
Oscar F. Minch - Wisconsin State Representative

Notes

Unincorporated communities in Wisconsin
Unincorporated communities in Dane County, Wisconsin
Madison, Wisconsin, metropolitan statistical area